Zdravko is a masculine given name of South Slavic origin derived from word "zdrav" meaning "healthy". Notable people with the name include:

Zdravko Čolić, Bosnian singer
Zdravko Ježić, Croatian water polo player
Zdravko Kovačić, Croatian water polo player
Zdravko Kuzmanović, Swiss-born Serbian footballer
Zdravko Lazarov, Bulgarian footballer
Zdravko Ponoš, Serbian politician and general
Zdravko Radulović, Montenegrin-born Croatian basketball player
Zdravko Rajkov, Serbian footballer and manager
Zdravko Šotra, Bosnian Serb film director and screenwriter
Zdravko Zdravkov, Bulgarian footballer

See also
Slavic names
Zdravkov
Zdravković

References

Croatian masculine given names
Serbian masculine given names
Bosnian masculine given names
Bulgarian masculine given names
Slovene masculine given names
Montenegrin masculine given names
Slavic masculine given names